Charles Emmit Hall (July 30, 1923 – May 24, 1996) was an American Negro league outfielder in the 1940s.

A native of Webster Groves, Missouri, Hall played for the Kansas City Monarchs in 1948. In his lone recorded game, he went hitless in two at-bats. Hall died in St. Louis, Missouri in 1996 at age 72.

References

External links
 and Seamheads

1923 births
1996 deaths
Kansas City Monarchs players
20th-century African-American sportspeople